The 2022 concert tour by the rock supergroup Ringo Starr & His All-Starr Band began on 27 May 2022 in Rama, Ontario, Canada. The tour was originally scheduled to begin in 2020, but was postponed to 2021 due to the COVID-19 pandemic. In 2021, the group's lead vocalist, Ringo Starr, stated that they would not be touring that year. After the tour eventually commenced in May 2022, it was brought to a halt the following month when All-Starr band members Edgar Winter and Steve Lukather tested positive for COVID-19; the remaining tour dates, originally scheduled for June and July 2022, were postponed to September and October, adding on to the planned autumn leg of the tour. 

The tour ended prematurely when, on 13 October 2022, Starr cancelled all remaining dates when he tested positive for COVID-19.

The setlist for the tour included songs by Starr—both by his former band the Beatles and from his career as a solo artist—as well as songs by All-Starr band members and their associated bands, including Winter (formerly of the Edgar Winter Group), Lukather and Warren Ham (both members of Toto), Hamish Stuart (formerly of the Average White Band), and Colin Hay of Men at Work.

Reception
Jane Stevenson of the Toronto Sun, reviewing the 27 May concert at Rama, Ontario, gave the show a rating of three out of four stars, commending Starr's performances of his Beatles-era and solo career songs, as well as Hay's vocals.

The Boston Globes Mark Hirsh, in his review of the 2 June show at Boston, Massachusetts' Boch Center Wang Theatre, wrote that the lineup of the All-Starr Band "was a bit more seamless than past conglomerations", and that the concert itself is "designed to do little more than wrap the audience in amiably comforting familiarity for an hour and a half." Hirsh concluded that, "as mission statement 'With a Little Help from My Friends' closed out his show (with a 'Give Peace a Chance' chaser) for the umpteenth time, it was clear Starr knows he can't do it alone. It was equally clear he doesn't want to."

Scott Mervis of the Pittsburgh Post-Gazette wrote positively of the 10 September show at Pittsburgh, Pennsylvania's PPG Paints Arena, stating that "[Starr is] as youthful at 82 as anyone could be, and his skills as a brilliant drummer and modest singer are still intact." Mervis praised the performances of the songs on the setlist, writing that the performance of Toto's "Rosanna" "rocked about 10 times harder than the studio version," and noted that, "The crowd got a steady stream of hits but not much in the way of production. It was nothing but a cloth psychedelic backdrop with projections of stars on it. No video screens at all, which is not great for an arena show."

Also reviewing the 10 September concert, The Beaver County Times Scott Tady praised the setlist, Hay's vocal range, Lukather's "searing guitar work", and Warren Ham's instrumental and vocal contributions. Tady added that "Starr sounded in vintage form singing the final three songs," and summarized the show as "No fancy lights, no nostalgic video projections, no elaborate stage design − just a Beatle and his truly All-Starr Band − playing the hits well, and with enthusiasm, as they brought joy to fans. [...] A Starr-y, Starry-y night to remember warmly."

Setlist

Tour dates

Notes

References

Bibliography
 

2022 concert tours
Ringo Starr & His All-Starr Band